Two ships of the United States Navy have been named Castine for a town in Maine.

 , was a gunboat launched in 1892 and decommissioned in 1919. Lieutenant Chester Nimitz served aboard her in 1912.
 , was a gunboat, originally named PC-452 and reclassified Castine (IX-211) on 10 March 1945.

United States Navy ship names